Chelidonura amoena is a species of sea slug, or "headshield slug", a marine opisthobranch gastropod mollusk in the family Aglajidae.

Distribution
Chelidonura amoena is widespread throughout the tropical waters of the central area of Indo-Pacific region.

References

External links
 Chelidonura amoena. SeaSlug Forum
 images
http://www.marinespecies.org/aphia.php?p=taxdetails&id=213149
 

Aglajidae
Gastropods described in 1905